The 1953 Soviet Cup was an association football cup competition of the Soviet Union.

Competition schedule

First round
 [Jul 23] 
 SPARTAK Tashkent             1-0  Spartak Tbilisi 
   [Y.Golenbaum] 
 [Aug 30] 
 DINAMO Kutaisi               1-0  Torpedo Gorkiy 
   [G.Mekvabishvili] 
 Torpedo Kirovograd           1-2  AVANGARD Sverdlovsk 
   [Viktor Tretyakov – V.Listochkin, Kozhevnikov] 
 Torpedo Vladimir             1-2  DINAMO Alma-Ata               [aet] 
 Zenit Kaliningrad (M.R.)     0-1  TORPEDO Stalingrad 
   [Dubovitskiy] 
 [Sep 3] 
 Metallurg Chimkent           1-4  METALLURG Zaporozhye     [in Guryev] 
   [Golubev – Malakhov-2, K.Pavlov, P.Ponomaryov] 
 [Sep 4] 
 Dinamo Tallinn               1-2  KHIMIK Moskva 
   [Pillu 72 – Krutikov 52, Savin 56] 
 SPARTAK Ashkhabad            4-1  Metallurg Odessa 
   [S.Maduntsev 27, 28, M.Borkin 40, V.Yepikhin 77 – M.Cherkasskiy 70] 
 [Sep 5] 
 DINAMO-2 Leningrad           3-1  Kalev Tallinn 
   [S.Kornilov, D.Nikolin, Subbotin – Nell] 
 [Sep 6] 
 DINAMO Frunze                w/o  Krasnoye Znamya Ivanovo 
 DINAMO Kishinev              w/o  Dinamo Minsk 
 DINAMO Petrozavodsk          w/o  Dinamo Yerevan 
 Dinamo Stalinabad            3-3  Avangard Chelyabinsk 
   [F.Rukavishnikov, N.Dolzhnikov, K.Shakirov – Semyonov, Ivanov, Tufatulin] 
 KHIMIK Kirovakan             1-0  Spartak Kalinin 
   [A.Mkhoyan] 
 KRASNY METALLURG Liepaja     3-0  Krylya Sovetov Molotov 
 NEFTYANIK Baku               4-2  Krasnaya Zvezda Petrozavodsk 
   [Yuriy Kuznetsov-2, Timakov-2 – Nikiforov, Chumichov]

First round replays
 [Sep 7] 
 Dinamo Stalinabad            1-3  AVANGARD Chelyabinsk 
   [N.Dolzhnikov – Zhenishek, Tufatulin, Ahmanayev]

Second round
 [Aug 23] 
 Lima Kaunas                  0-4  METALLURG Dnepropetrovsk 
   [Shikov-2, Kozachenko, G.Ponomaryov] 
 Spartak Minsk                1-2  ISKRA Frunze 
   [Vorobyov - ?] 
 [Aug 24] 
 Lokomotiv Mary               0-9  SHAKHTYOR Stalino        [in Ashkhabad] 
   [Ivan Boboshko-2, A.Koloskov-2, Ivan Fedosov-2, V.Churikov-2, V.Samoilov] 
 [Aug 28] 
 Dinamo Baku                  2-5  TORPEDO Rostov-na-Donu 
   [Tsaritsyn, Dmitriyev – A.Grigoryev-2, V.Kruglov-2, G.Fursov] 
 [Sep 6] 
 Khimik Chirchik              0-3  DAUGAVA Riga 
   [Y.Balykin, B.Reingold, Alfons Jegers] 
 [Sep 7] 
 Spartak Tashkent             0-0  Dinamo Kutaisi 
 [Sep 10] 
 Dinamo Kishinev              1-1  Dinamo Alma-Ata 
   [Starostin – Mezhov] 
 [Sep 12] 
 BUREVESTNIK Kishinev         3-0  Dinamo-2 Leningrad 
   [Kornilov, Bakhmutov, Pyatkovskiy] 
 Neftyanik Baku               1-1  Khimik Moskva 
   [Abil-Zade 13 pen – Krutikov ?] 
 [Sep 13] 
 AVANGARD Chelyabinsk         w/o  Dinamo Yerevan       
 GORNYAK Leninabad            w/o  Avangard Sverdlovsk 
 METALLURG Zaporozhye         8-3  Khimik Kirovakan 
   [O.Kiknadze-2, K.Pavlov-2, P.Ponomaryov-2, B.Zozulya, I.Kostynchak – Kalashan pen, Suchkov (M) og, A.Arutyunyan] 
 SPARTAK Ashkhabad            2-1  Krasny Metallurg Liepaja 
   [Borkin 40, Bagirov 70 – G.Zviedris 81] 
 TORPEDO Stalingrad           w/o  Dinamo Frunze

Second round replays
 [Sep 8] 
 SPARTAK Tashkent             4-2  Dinamo Kutaisi 
   [V.Undakov-2, V.Vitkalov, L.Maksudov – G.Mepisashvili, G.Kobzianidze] 
 [Sep 11] 
 Dinamo Kishinev              0-1  DINAMO Alma-Ata 
   [Sudomoyev] 
 [Sep 13] 
 NEFTYANIK Baku               4-1  Khimik Moskva 
   [Timakov-2, Yuriy Kuznetsov, Mikuchadze – Biryulin]

Third round
 SHAKHTYOR Stalino            w/o  Avangard Chelyabinsk 
 [Sep 6] 
 METALLURG Dnepropetrovsk     1-0  Torpedo Rostov-na-Donu 
   [Shikov] 
 [Sep 10] 
 Iskra Frunze                 0-2  DAUGAVA Riga 
   [Viktor Zhilin 30, 35] 
 [Sep 15] 
 Burevestnik Kishinev         0-1  DINAMO Alma-Ata 
   [Vasin] 
 [Sep 16] 
 SPARTAK Ashkhabad            1-0  Spartak Tashkent 
   [Borkin] 
 [Sep 18] 
 DINAMO-2 Moskva              1-0  Dinamo Petrozavodsk 
 GORNYAK Leninabad            8-4  Neftyanik Baku 
   [Zaynutdinov-2, Korobov-2, Klimanov-2, Suetin, Yushnov – Yuriy Kuznetsov-2, Suleymanov, Timakov] 
 METALLURG Zaporozhye         4-1  Torpedo Stalingrad   
   [P.Ponomaryov-2, O.Kiknadze, I.Kostynchak – Dubovitskiy]

Fourth round
 [Aug 30] 
 SHAKHTYOR Stalino            1-0  Dinamo-2 Moskva 
   [Leonid Savinov 46] 
 [Sep 17] 
 DAUGAVA Riga                 5-1  Metallurg Dnepropetrovsk 
   [Zhilin-2, Jegers-2, Balykin – Klochko] 
 [Sep 23] 
 DINAMO Alma-Ata              6-2  Gornyak Leninabad        [in Moskva] 
   [Mezhov-2, Bolotov-2, Vasin-2 – Klimanov, Yushnov] 
 METALLURG Zaporozhye         6-2  Spartak Ashkhabad        [in Moskva] 
   [I.Kostynchak-2, P.Ponomaryov-2, B.Zozulya, O.Kiknadze – Maduntsev, Yepikhin]

Fifth round
 [Sep 18] 
 TORPEDO Moskva               3-1  Zenit Leningrad 
   [Vyacheslav Solovyov 7, Vitaliy Vatskevich ?, Boris Safronov ? – N.Gartvig 84] 
 [Sep 21] 
 Dinamo Moskva                2-2  Dinamo Leningrad 
   [Vladimir Shabrov 42, Sergei Korshunov 86 – Georgiy Grammatikopulo 2, Alexei Kolobov 3] 
 [Sep 22] 
 LOKOMOTIV Moskva             1-0  Lokomotiv Kharkov 
   [Yevgeniy Bologov] 
 [Sep 24] 
 Daugava Riga                 0-0  Spartak Vilnius 
 [Sep 27] 
 DINAMO Tbilisi               4-0  Dinamo Kiev              [in Moskva] 
   [Avtandil Gogoberidze 37, Zaur Kaloyev 57, Georgiy Antadze 73, Avtandil Chkuaseli 86] 
 SPARTAK Moskva               5-0  Metallurg Zaporozhye 
   [Nikolai Dementyev-3, Nikita Simonyan, Anatoliy Ilyin] 
 [Sep 28] 
 Shakhtyor Stalino            0-0  Dinamo Alma-Ata

Fifth round replays
 [Sep 22] 
 DINAMO Moskva                3-0  Dinamo Leningrad 
   [Vladimir Shabrov 23, Konstantin Beskov 57, 68] 
 [Sep 25] 
 DAUGAVA Riga                 1-0  Spartak Vilnius 
   [Viktor Zhilin 13] 
 [Sep 29] 
 SHAKHTYOR Stalino            2-0  Dinamo Alma-Ata 
   [Valentin Sapronov, Leonid Savinov]

Quarterfinals
 [Sep 23] 
 Torpedo Moskva               0-1  ZENIT Kuibyshev 
   [Fyodor Novikov 39] 
 [Oct 1] 
 DINAMO Moskva                1-0  Dinamo Tbilisi 
   [Konstantin Beskov 85] 
 [Oct 2] 
 SHAKHTYOR Stalino            2-1  Daugava Riga             [in Moskva] 
   [Valentin Sapronov, Koloskov – Janis Uzulis] 
 [Oct 3] 
 LOKOMOTIV Moskva             1-0  Spartak Moskva                [aet] 
   [Anatoliy Bashashkin (S) 103 og]

Semifinals
 [Oct 5] 
 DINAMO Moskva                1-0  Shakhtyor Stalino 
   [Vladimir Shabrov 80] 
 [Oct 6] 
 Lokomotiv Moskva             0-2  ZENIT Kuibyshev 
   [Alexandr Gulevskiy 21, Grigoriy Gornostayev 72]

Final

External links
 Complete calendar. helmsoccer.narod.ru
 1953 Soviet Cup. Footballfacts.ru
 1953 Soviet football season. RSSSF

Soviet Cup seasons
Cup
Soviet Cup
Soviet Cup